Gouripur Gaon is a small village in Morigaon district, Assam, India. There is a primary school named Gouripur Lower Primary School (Gouripur prathamik bidyaloi, in Assamese).

Villages in Morigaon district